"Heed Their Rising Voices" is a 1960 newspaper advertisement published in The New York Times.  It was published on March 29, 1960 and paid for by the "Committee to Defend Martin Luther King and the Struggle for Freedom in the South".  The purpose of the advertisement was to attract attention and steer support towards Martin Luther King Jr. A recent felony charge of perjury was leveled against King and could have resulted in a lengthy imprisonment.  The headline of the advertisement was drawn from a phrase used in the New York Times editorial, "Amendment XV", published on March 19, 1960.  The advertisement became the source of a libel suit in the United States Supreme Court case New York Times Co. v. Sullivan (1964).

See also
Civil Rights Movement
Text of "Heed Their Rising Voices"

References

Further reading

1960 in American politics
Advertisements
Civil rights movement
Martin Luther King Jr.
Works originally published in The New York Times